"Astounded" is a song written and recorded by the American rock band Tantric. It was released on July 17, 2001, as the second single from their debut album, Tantric, and the successor to their chart-topping debut single "Breakdown".

Charts

2001 singles
2001 songs
Tantric (band) songs
Maverick Records singles
Songs written by Hugo Ferreira
Songs written by Jesse Vest
Songs written by Todd Whitener
Songs written by Matt Taul